Big Brother 16 is the sixteenth season of various versions of Big Brother and may refer to:

 Big Brother 16 (U.S.), the 2014 edition of the U.S. version
 Big Brother 16 (UK), the 2015 edition of the UK version
 Gran Hermano 16, the 2015 edition of the Spanish version
 Big Brother Brasil 16, the 2016 edition of the Brazilian version

See also
 Big Brother (franchise)
 Big Brother (disambiguation)